= Moussaoui =

Moussaoui is a North African personal name (Mûsâ) which corresponds to the Prophet Moses (Hebrew Mosheh). Derivatives: Moussaoui, El Moussaoui. The Moussaoui are those who belong to the family or tribe of Moussa (Moses). in Algeria (particularly), and in Morocco in the (Rif). The origin of this name comes from the Arabic term "Mousa" meaning "Moses", which may suggest an ancestral connection to biblical history and the Hebrew tribes. In historical context, ancestors with this name may have connections to the periods of Ancient Egypt and the Exodus. The surname is also common amongst the Ouled Moussa tribe of the larger Reguibat confederation of the Western Sahara.
